Eucithara  is a genus of small to quite large sea snails, marine gastropod mollusks in the family Mangeliidae.

This genus has been a convenient dumping ground for many Indo-Pacific species. A profound study is still lacking and polyphyly probably occurs, as shown by the radulae of the few species examined.

Description
Species in this genus show a rather solid turreted-fusiform shell, sculptured by bold longitudinal ribs, over-run by dense spiral threads, and decussated by an even finer radial striatum. The aperture is as long, or longer, than the spire, fortified externally by a stout varix which ascends the previous whorl, includes a semi-circular sinus, and extends a free edge over the mouth. Within the outer lip are a series of short entering ridges, and the columella bears a corresponding series of deeply entering horizontal bars.

Distribution
This genus has a wide distribution in the Red Sea, the Persian Gulf, the Indian Ocean, the Pacific Ocean, the East China Sea; off Australia (Northern Territory, Queensland, Tasmania, Western Australia).

Species
According to the World Register of Marine Species (WoRMS), the following species with accepted names are included within the genus Eucithara 

 Eucithara abakcheutos Kilburn, 1992
 Eucithara abbreviata (Garrett, 1873)
 Eucithara alacris Hedley, 1922
 Eucithara albivestis (Pilsbry, 1934)
 Eucithara amabilis (Nevill & Nevill, 1874)
 Eucithara angela (Adams & Angas, 1864)
 Eucithara angiostoma (Pease, 1868)
 Eucithara antillarum (Reeve, 1846)
 Eucithara arenivaga Hedley, 1922
 Eucithara articulata (Sowerby III, 1894)
 Eucithara bascauda (Melvill & Standen, 1896)
 Eucithara bathyraphe (Smith E. A., 1882)
 Eucithara bicolor (Reeve, 1846)
 Eucithara bisacchii (Hornung & Mermod, 1929)
 Eucithara brocha Hedley, 1922
 Eucithara caledonica (Smith E. A., 1882)
 Eucithara capillaris Kilburn & Dekker, 2008
 Eucithara capillata (Hervier, 1897)
 Eucithara castanea (Reeve, 1846)
 Eucithara cazioti (Preston, 1905)
 Eucithara celebensis (Hinds, 1843)
 Eucithara cincta (Reeve, 1846)
 Eucithara cinnamomea (Hinds, 1843)
 Eucithara columbelloides (Reeve, 1846)
 Eucithara compressicosta (Boettger, 1895)
 Eucithara coniformis (Reeve, 1846)
 Eucithara conohelicoides (Reeve, 1846)
 Eucithara coronata (Hinds, 1843)
 Eucithara crystallina (Hervier, 1897)
 Eucithara dealbata  (R.P.J. Hervier, 1897)
 Eucithara debilis (Pease, 1868)
 Eucithara decussata (Pease, 1868)
 Eucithara delacouriana (Crosse, 1869)
 Eucithara diaglypha (Hervier, 1897)
 Eucithara dubiosa (Nevill & Nevill, 1875)
 Eucithara duplaris (Melvill, 1923)
 Eucithara edithae (Melvill & Standen, 1901)
 Eucithara elegans (Reeve, 1846)
 Eucithara ella (Thiele, 1925)
 Eucithara eumerista (Melvill & Standen, 1896)
 Eucithara fasciata (L.A. Reeve, 1846)
 Eucithara funebris (Reeve, 1846)
 Eucithara funiculata (Reeve, 1846)
 Eucithara fusiformis (Reeve, 1846)
 Eucithara gevahi Singer, 2012
 Eucithara gibbosa (Reeve, 1846)
 Eucithara gracilis (Reeve, 1846)
 Eucithara gradata (Nevill & Nevill, 1875)
 Eucithara grata (Smith E. A., 1884)
 Eucithara gruveli (Dautzenberg, 1932)
 Eucithara guentheri (Sowerby III, 1893)
 Eucithara harpellina (Hervier, 1897)
 Eucithara hirasei (Pilsbry, 1904)
 Eucithara interstriata (Smith E. A., 1876)
 Eucithara isophanes (R.P.J. Hervier, 1897)
 Eucithara isseli (Nevill & Nevill, 1875)
 Eucithara lamellata (Reeve, 1846)
 Eucithara lepidella (Hervier, 1897)
 Eucithara lota (Gould, 1860)
 Eucithara lyra (Reeve, 1846)
 Eucithara macteola Kilburn, 1992
 Eucithara makadiensis Kilburn & Dekker, 2008
 Eucithara marerosa Kilburn, 1992
 Eucithara marginelloides (Reeve, 1846)
 Eucithara milia (R.A. Philippi, 1851)
 Eucithara miriamica Hedley, 1922
 Eucithara monochoria Hedley, 1922
 Eucithara moraria Hedley, 1922
 Eucithara nana (Reeve, 1846)
 Eucithara nevilliana (Preston, 1904)
 Eucithara novaehollandiae (Reeve, 1846)
 Eucithara obesa (Reeve, 1846)
 Eucithara pagoda (May, 1911)
 Eucithara paucicostata (Pease, 1868)
 Eucithara perhumerata Kilburn & Dekker, 2008
 Eucithara planilabrum (Reeve, 1843)
 Eucithara pulchella (Reeve, 1846)
 Eucithara pulchra Bozzetti, 2009
 Eucithara pusilla (Pease, 1860)
 Eucithara ringens (Sowerby III, 1893)
 Eucithara rufolineata S. Higo & Y. Goto, 1993
 Eucithara seychellarum (Smith E. A., 1884)
 Eucithara solida (Reeve, 1846)
 Eucithara souverbiei (Tryon, 1884)
 Eucithara striatella (Smith E. A., 1884)
 Eucithara striatissima (Sowerby III, 1907)
 Eucithara stromboides (Reeve, 1846)
 Eucithara subglobosa (Hervier, 1897)
 Eucithara subterranea (P.F. Röding, 1798)
 Eucithara tenebrosa (Reeve, 1846)
 Eucithara trivittata (Adams & Reeve, 1850)
 Eucithara turricula (Reeve, 1846)
 Eucithara typhonota (Melvill & Standen, 1901)
 Eucithara typica (Smith E. A., 1884)
 Eucithara ubuhle Kilburn, 1992
 Eucithara unicolor Bozzetti, 2020
 Eucithara unilineata (Smith E. A., 1876)
 Eucithara vexillum (Reeve, 1846)
 Eucithara villaumeae Kilburn & Dekker, 2008
 Eucithara vitiensis (Smith E. A., 1884)
 Eucithara vittata (Hinds, 1843)

Species brought into synonymy

 Eucithara abyssicola (Reeve, 1846) : synonym of Eucithara vittata (Hinds, 1843)
 Eucithara anna F.P. Jousseaume, 1883: synonym of Eucithara novaehollandiae (Reeve, 1846)
 Eucithara balansai J.C.H. Crosse, 1873: synonym of Eucithara angela (A. Adams & G.F. Angas, 1864)
 Eucithara basedowi Hedley, 1918 : synonym of Pseudanachis basedowi (Hedley, 1918)
 Eucithara biclathrata S.M. Souverbie in S.M. Souverbie & R.P. Montrouzier, 1872 : synonym of Eucithara vittata (Hinds, 1843)
 Eucithara brevis W.H. Pease, 1867: synonym of Eucithara coronata cithara (A.A. Gould, 1851)
 Eucithara butonensis (Schepman, 1913): synonym of Cytharopsis butonensis (Schepman, 1913)
 Eucithara capillacea (Reeve, 1846): synonym of Eucithara coronata (Hinds, 1843)
 Eucithara chionea J.C. Melvill & R. Standen, 1899: synonym of Eucithara coronata (Hinds, 1843)
 Eucithara citharella E.A. Smith, 1876: synonym of Eucithara lyra (Reeve, 1846)
 Eucithara compta (Adams & Angas, 1864)synonym of Marita compta (A. Adams & Angas, 1864)
 Eucithara coniformis S.M. Souverbie, 1875: synonym of  Eucithara souverbiei (Tryon, 1884)
 Eucithara crassilabrum (Reeve, 1846): synonym of Eucithara novaehollandiae (Reeve, 1846)
 Eucithara cylindrica (Reeve, 1846) : synonym of Gingicithara cylindrica (Reeve, 1846)
 Eucithara daedalea W.H. Pease, 1867: synonym of Eucithara debilis (Pease, 1868)
 Eucithara deliciosa  K.H. Barnard, 1959: synonym of Pseudorhaphitoma ichthys (Melvill, J.C., 1910)
 Eucithara effosa P.F. Röding, 1798: synonym of  Eucithara subterranea (P.F. Röding, 1798)
 Eucithara eupoecila R.P.J. Hervier, 1897: synonym of Eucithara coronata (Hinds, 1843)
 Eucithara euselma (Melvill & Standen, 1896) : synonym of Gingicithara notabilis (E. A. Smith, 1888)
 Eucithara glariosa (A.A. Gould, 1860): synonym of Cythara glareosa Gould, A.A., 1860
 Eucithara guestieri (Souverbie, 1872): synonym of Eucithara novaehollandiae (L.A. Reeve, 1846)
 Eucithara hornbeckii L.A. Reeve, 1846: synonym of Eucithara coronata (Hinds, 1843)
 Eucithara hypercalles Melvill, J.C., 1898: synonym of Eucithara fusiformis (Reeve, 1846)
 Eucithara iota A.A. Gould, 1860: synonym of Eucithara lota (Gould, 1860)
 Eucithara lyrica (Reeve, 1846 in 1843-65) : synonym of Gingicithara lyrica (Reeve, 1846)
 Eucithara matakuana (Smith, 1884) : synonym of Eucithara delacouriana (Crosse, 1869)
 Eucithara onager (S.M. Souverbie, 1875): synonym of Eucithara conohelicoides (L.A. Reeve, 1846)
 Eucithara optabilis G.B. III Sowerby, 1907: synonym of Eucithara coronata (Hinds, 1843)
 Eucithara pallida (Reeve, 1846): synonym of Eucithara coronata (Hinds, 1843)
 Eucithara pellucida (Reeve, 1846) : synonym of Citharomangelia pellucida (Reeve, 1846)
 Eucithara phyllidis Hedley, 1922 : synonym of Anacithara phyllidis (Hedley, 1922)
 Eucithara pura H.A. Pilsbry, 1904: synonym of Eucithara albivestis (H.A. Pilsbry, 1934)
 Eucithara porcellanea (Kilburn, 1992): synonym of Leiocithara Hedley, 1922
 Eucithara pygmaea G.B. Sowerby, 1846: synonym of Eucithara isseli (Nevill & Nevill, 1875)
 Eucithara quadrilineata (G. B. Sowerby III, 1913): synonym of Citharomangelia quadrilineata (G. B. Sowerby III, 1913)
 Eucithara raffini R.P.J. Hervier, 1897: synonym of Eucithara unilineata (Smith E. A., 1876)
 Eucithara reticulata (Reeve, 1846) : synonym of Eucithara obesa (Reeve, 1846)
 Eucithara rubrocincta E.A. Smith, 1882: synonym of Eucithara vittata (Hinds, 1843)
 Eucithara semizonata (Hervier, 1897): synonym of Eucithara coronata (Hinds, 1843)
 Eucithara signa J.C. Melvill & R. Standen, 1896, 1897: synonym of  Eucithara eumerista (Melvill & Standen, 1896)
 Eucithara stellatomoides  (Shuto, 1883): synonym of Antiguraleus stellatomoides Shuto, 1983
 Eucithara subgibbosa (Hervier, 1897): synonym of Eucithara coronata (Hinds, 1843)
 Eucithara triticea L.A. Reeve, 1843: synonym of Eucithara angiostoma (W.H. Pease, 1868)
 Eucithara unifasciata (G.P. Deshayes, 1834) : synonym of Mangelia unifasciata (Deshayes, 1835) 
 Eucithara waterhousei (Smith E. A., 1884) : synonym of Eucithara coronata (Hinds, 1843)
 Eucithara zonata (Reeve, 1846): synonym of Eucithara coronata (Hinds, 1843)

The Indo-Pacific Molluscan Database adds the following names in current use to the list 
 Eucithara cinnamomea cinnamomea (Hinds, 1843-g)
 Eucithara cithara (Gould, 1851): synonym of Eucithara coronata cithara (A.A. Gould, 1851)
 Eucithara gracilis gracilis (Reeve, 1846 in 1843-65)
 Eucithara gracilis striolata (Bouge & Dautzenberg, 1914)

References

 Fischer, 1883: Manuel de conchyliologie et de paléontologie conchyliologique, (6): 593
 Kilburn R.N. 1992. Turridae (Mollusca: Gastropoda) of southern Africa and Mozambique. Part 6. Subfamily Mangeliinae, section 1. Annals of the Natal Museum, 33: 461–575

External links
  Powell, Arthur William Baden. "The Australian Tertiary Mollusca of the Family Turridae." Records of the Auckland Institute and Museum 3.1 (1944): p. 58:  Eucithara glabra (Harris, 1897)
  Bouchet, P.; Kantor, Y. I.; Sysoev, A.; Puillandre, N. (2011). A new operational classification of the Conoidea. Journal of Molluscan Studies. 77, 273-308
 Worldwide Mollusc Species Data Base: Mangeliidae